Rhode Island held its election August 30, 1814.

See also 
 United States House of Representatives elections, 1814 and 1815
 List of United States representatives from Rhode Island

1814
Rhode Island
United States House of Representatives